Patrick Burgoyne is a New Zealand professional rugby league footballer who played in the 1980s. He played at club level for Glenora Bears, Featherstone Rovers (Heritage № 612), Sheffield Eagles, and Bramley.

Playing career
Patrick Burgoyne was awarded The Rothville Trophy in 1986. This award was presented to the Auckland Rugby League Premier One player of the year in the Auckland Rugby League club trophies, and is selected by the Auckland Coach. Patrick Burgoyne made his début for Featherstone Rovers on Sunday 6 October 1985.

References

Bramley RLFC players
Featherstone Rovers players
Glenora Bears players
Living people
New Zealand rugby league players
Place of birth missing (living people)
Sheffield Eagles players
Year of birth missing (living people)